The  is a luxury charter train service in Japan, operated by East Japan Railway Company (JR East). It used to operate as a Limited express from July 1999 until March 2016. It ran between Ueno Station in Tokyo and the city of Sapporo in the northern island of Hokkaido. The one-way journey took approximately 16 hours.

Route
The Cassiopeia ran on the following rail lines:

JR East
 Tōhoku Main Line, Ueno - Morioka
IGR Iwate Ginga Railway
 Iwate Galaxy Railway Line, Morioka - Metoki
Aoimori Railway
 Aoimori Railway Line, Metoki - Aomori
JR East
 Tsugaru Line, Aomori - Naka-Oguni
JR Hokkaido
 Kaikyō Line, Naka-Oguni - Kikonai
 Esashi Line, Kikonai - Goryōkaku
 Hakodate Main Line, Goryōkaku - Hakodate - Oshamambe
 Muroran Main Line, Oshamambe - Numanohata
 Chitose Line, Numanohata - Shiroishi
 Hakodate Main Line, Shiroishi - Sapporo

The train changed direction at Aomori and Hakodate.

Southbound trains to Ueno departed from Sapporo after 16:00; the first stop after leaving Hokkaido was at Sendai, around 04:30 the following day, and the arrival time at Ueno Station around 09:30.

Trains departed three times per week, with more departures during holiday periods.

Rolling stock

The train was formed of twelve E26 series sleeping cars, including a lounge car at the Sapporo end and a deluxe suite at the Ueno end. The train was hauled by a JR East Tabata-based Class EF510-500 dual-voltage electric locomotive between Ueno and Aomori, by a JR Hokkaido ED79 AC electric locomotive between Aomori and Hakodate, and by a pair of JR Hokkaido DD51 diesel locomotives between Hakodate and Sapporo. Prior to June 2010, the services were hauled by JR East Class EF81 dual-voltage electric locomotives.

Formation

Accommodation and fares

The Cassiopeia consisted of all type "A" accommodation, all specific to this particular train. A flat fee was charged for all rooms, regardless of starting or ending location. Accommodation rates ranged from about ¥27,000 for a Cassiopeia Twin room to ¥51,000 for a Cassiopeia Suite.

The other fares, the basic fare and limited express fare, were based on distance. For tourists using the Japan Rail Pass, the basic fare did not have to be paid.

History
The Cassiopeia service first ran on 16 July 1999.

From the start of the revised timetable on 17 March 2012, smoking was banned in the restaurant car of Cassiopeia services.

End of scheduled services
The last scheduled Cassiopeia services were discontinued in March 2016 ahead of the opening of the Hokkaido Shinkansen high-speed line. The last down service departed from Ueno Station in Tokyo on 19 March 2016, and the last up service departed from Sapporo on 20 March, arriving at Ueno on 21 March.

Cruise services
Neither JR East nor JR Hokkaido owns electric locomotives capable of operating through the Seikan Tunnel to and from Hokkaido after the overhead line voltage was raised from 20 kV to 25 kV AC with the opening of the Hokkaido Shinkansen on 26 March 2016, but JR East leases JR Freight electric locomotives to haul the Cassiopeia trainset on seasonal services through the Seikan Tunnel after the Hokkaido Shinkansen opened. The coaches are also used on cruise train services to other destinations within the JR East region.

See also
 List of named passenger trains of Japan
 Hokutosei, another night train that ran between Tokyo and Sapporo until August 2015 
 Seven Stars in Kyushu, a luxury sleeping car train operated by JR Kyushu
 Twilight Express Mizukaze, a luxury sleeping car excursion train planned by JR West in Japan

References

 JR Timetable, March 2008 issue

External links 

 

Named passenger trains of Japan
Hokkaido Railway Company
East Japan Railway Company
Night trains of Japan
Railway services introduced in 1999
Railway services discontinued in 2016
1999 establishments in Japan
2016 disestablishments in Japan